Figline Valdarno is a frazione in the  comune of Figline e Incisa Valdarno in the Metropolitan City of Florence in the Italian region of Tuscany, located about  southeast of Florence. It is the birthplace of Marsilio Ficino.

It was a separate commune until January 1, 2014.

Main sights
 Church of San Pietro al Terreno, known from 1148, restored in the 18th century
 Chapel of Villa di San Cerbone, with an Annunciation by Il Cigoli
 Collegiate Church of Santa Maria, with a panel by the Master of Figline (after 1317)
 Convent and Church of St. Francis 
 Monastery of Santa Croce
 Pieve of San Romolo at Gaville, a Romanesque church with a rich sculptural decoration
 Abbey of San Cassiano

Transportation

The town is served by the station with frequent trains to Florence and Arezzo. Near the station there is a bus terminal that connects Figline with the towns nearby.

Twin towns
  Canals, Valencia, Spain
  Pfungstadt, Germany

References

External links

 Official website

Cities and towns in Tuscany